Sergei Yurevitch Filin (born 27 October 1970) is a Russian ballet dancer and the former artistic director of the Bolshoi Theater from 2011 through 2016. He is currently the Director of the Young Artists Ballet Program at the Bolshoi Theatre.
Previously, he was the artistic director of the ballet at the Stanislavski and Nemirovich-Danchenko Moscow Academic Music Theatre, serving in this capacity from 2008 to 2011.

Ballet career 
Filin was born in Moscow. He started dancing at age seven at the V. Loktev's Children's Ensemble of Folk Dances. At this time, he appeared with Oleg Popov in the film The Sun in the Bag. At the age of nine, he was accepted into the Moscow Choreographic Institute. In 1988, he joined the corps de ballet of the Bolshoi Ballet in Moscow.

He was promoted to the rank of Premier with the Bolshoi Ballet Company in 1990. He was also a principal dancer with the State Ballet of Georgia and guest soloist with the Vienna State Opera. His dance partners have included Galina Stepanenko, Nina Ananiashvili, Svetlana Lunkina, Maria Alexandrova, Svetlana Zakharova, and Natalia Osipova.

Among his repertoire, Filin danced as Colas in La Fille Mal Gardée, the Teacher in The Lesson, and as Classical Dancer in The Bright Stream, a role for which he received the prestigious award Golden Mask.

In December 2004, Filin suffered a severe injury while performing on stage at the Bolshoi Theatre. This incident put his career on hold for several months, before returning to the dance scene in the second half of the following year.

On 18 March 2011, he was appointed to serve as the artistic director of the Bolshoi Ballet in Moscow. In this capacity, he has led the Bolshoi Ballet Tours in Paris, London, Japan and North America.

Acid attack 
On 17 January 2013, Filin was attacked with acid by an assailant who cornered him outside of his home in Moscow. He suffered third-degree burns to his face and neck. While it was initially reported that he was in danger of losing his eyesight, his physicians stated on 21 January 2013, that he would retain eyesight in one eye.

A confession to the attack was made by a man named Yury Zarutsky on 5 March 2013. He stated that Bolshoi Ballet Company dancer Pavel Dmitrichenko had hired both him and another man called Andrei Lipatov to attack Filin. According to Zarutsky, Lipatov drove him to Filin's home where he threw the acid in Filin's face. Following the confession, a spokesman from the Russian Interior Ministry stated that investigators considered the case closed. By 7 March, all three men confessed to the crime. Dmitrichenko confessed to arranging the attack, but maintained that he had not instructed the two men to use acid.

The attack came after a lengthy period of infighting and rows within the Bolshoi Ballet Company. Various motives have been presented by Russian police officials, primarily focusing on "personal hostile relations linked to their professional activities". Russia's television news and tabloid journalists surmised that Dmitrichenko was angry when Filin chose another dancer rather than Dmitrichenko's girlfriend, ballerina Anzhelina Vorontsova (ru) to portray Princess Odette, also known as the Swan Queen in Tchaikovsky's Swan Lake.

Dmitrichenko stated during a bail hearing that he was frustrated with the inequitable and "unjust" allocation of funds distributed to dancers in the company. When he voiced his frustration, Zarutsky suggested that they "beat up" Filin. In the courtroom, the judge questioned Dmitrichenko whether or not he would like to apologize to Filin. Dmitrichenko defiantly responded with "For what?" At that point, the judge denied bail, which resulted in incarceration for six weeks, while investigators and attorneys prepared for the trial. The three men who confessed to the crime faced a maximum sentence of 12 years. Dmitrichenko was sentenced to six years in prison, but he was released early for good behavior in May 2016 after serving just three years in prison. In October 2016, Dmitrichenko was granted a building pass to the Bolshoi Theater, and returned for morning exercises.

Roles 
Principal roles

Soloist roles

Honors and awards 
 1994: Prix Benois de la Danse International Dance Association Prize for his role of Prince Désiré in Sleeping Beauty
 1995: Dancer of the Year – Danza-Danza Magazine
 1996: Merited Artist of the Russian Federation
 2001: People's Artist of the Russian Federation
 2002: Soul of Dance ("Star of Dance") Ballet Magazine
 2004: Golden Mask International Theatre Prize for his role as The Classical Dancer in The Bright Stream
 2006: International Ballet Award Stars of the XXI Century

References

External links 
Article in the Small Ballet Encyclopedia 
Biography
Prix Benois de la Danse
Resume as Artistic Director of the Bolshoi Ballet
Newsclip of Sergei Filin's Appointment as new Artistic Director of the Bolshoi Ballet 
BBC News Interview, 3 February 2013
Archive footage of Sergei Filin and Nina Ananiashvili performing Charms of Mannerism in 1999 at Jacob's Pillow

Living people
People's Artists of Russia
Acid attack victims
1970 births
Prix Benois de la Danse winners
Russian male ballet dancers
Moscow State Academy of Choreography alumni